N. S. Harsha (born 1969) is an Indian contemporary artist from Mysore. He works in many media including painting, sculpture, site-specific installation, and public works.

A major retrospective of the artist took place at the Mori Art Museum, Tokyo, in 2017.

Early life 
Harsha earned a BFA in painting from Chamarajendra Academy of Visual Arts, Mysore in 1992 and an MFA in painting from Maharaja Sayajirao University, Baroda in 1995.

Work
His works "depict daily experiences in Mysore, southern India, where he is based, but also reflect wider cultural, political and economic globalization issues" and explore the "absurdity of the real world, representation and abstraction, and repeating images". His practice has been inspired by Indian popular and miniature painting.

Collections 
 Kiran Nadar Museum of Art.
 Queensland Art Gallery | Gallery of Modern Art (QAGOMA)

Major solo exhibitions 
 Mori Art Museum (2017)
 Dallas Museum of Art (2015 - 2016)
 DAAD, as part of the DAAD Artists-in-Berlin Program (2012 - 2013)
 INIVA, London (2009)
 Maison Hermes Tokyo (2008)

Major group exhibitions 
 Biennale of Sydney (2018)
 Kochi-Muziris Biennale, India (2014)
 Moscow Bienniale of Contemporary Art (2013)
 Dojima Biennial, Osaka (2013)
 Adelaide International Biennial (2012)
 Asian Art Museum, San Francisco (2012)
 the Yokohama Triennial (2011)
 Bienal de Sao Paulo (2010)
 Singapore Binenale (2006)
 Fukuoka Asian Art Triennial (2002)
 Asia Pacific Triennial of Contemporary Arts, Queensland Art Gallery, Brisbane, Australia (1999)
Harsha was also part of a major touring group exhibit, Indian Highway. The show traveled to the Serpentine Gallery, London (2008), Astrup Fearnley Museum of Modern Art, Oslo (2009), Herning Art Museum, Denmark (2010), Musée d'Art Contemporain, Lyon (2011) and MAXXI, Rome (2011–12).

Awards 
 DAAD Scholarship in (2012)
 Artes Mundi Prize (2008)
 Sanskriti Award (2003)
 Vasudev Arnawaz Award (1992)

References 

1969 births
Living people
Indian contemporary painters
Indian contemporary sculptors